Bunopus is a genus of small geckos, lizards in the family Gekkonidae. The genus is endemic to the Middle East.

Species
Three species are recognized as being valid.
Bunopus blanfordii  – Blanford's ground gecko
Bunopus crassicauda  – thickhead rock gecko 
Bunopus tuberculatus  – Baluch rock gecko

The species formerly known as Bunopus spatalurus, the spacious rock gecko, has been assigned to the genus Trachydactylus as Trachydactylus spatalurus.

References

External links
Werner YL (1987). "Gekkonid Lizards from Five Quarters Meet in Israel". Bull. Philadelphia Herp. Soc. 31.

Further reading
Blanford WT (1874). "Descriptions of new Lizards from Persia and Baluchistán". Ann. Mag. Nat. Hist., Fourth Series 13: 453–455. (Bunopus, new genus, p. 454; B. tuberculatus, new species, p. 454). (in English and Latin).

  Al-Quran, S. 2009. The Herpetofauna of the Southern Jordan. American-Eurasian J. Agric. & Environ. Sci., 6 (4): 385-391

  Al-Shammari, Ahmed M. 2012. Additional Records of Lizards in Ha'il Province, Saudi Arabia. Russ. J. Herpetol. 19 (4): 287-291

 
Lizard genera
Taxa named by William Thomas Blanford